Robbie Tew is a former professional rugby league footballer who played in the 1980s. He was part of the inaugural Newcastle Knights squad in 1988. He was born in Australia.

Background
Tew played rugby league for Redcliffe Dolphins and Toowoomba Clydesdales before signing with newly admitted side Newcastle in 1988.

Playing career
Tew made his first grade debut for Newcastle in the club's inaugural game and scored the side's first ever points in a 28-4 loss against Parramatta.  Tew went on to make a further 6 appearances in 1988 with his final game being a 24-16 loss against Illawarra.

Post playing
Tew was the coach of Workington Town in the UK in 1997. 
Tew later became Newcastle's footman and in 2020 was made a life member of the club.

References

1961 births
Living people
Australian rugby league players
Newcastle Knights players
Place of birth missing (living people)
Redcliffe Dolphins players
Rugby league five-eighths
Rugby league halfbacks
Toowoomba Clydesdales players
Workington Town coaches